Estadio Víctor Jara is an indoor multi-use sports complex located in the western part of Santiago, Chile, near the Estación Central and Alameda Avenue. It has a total capacity for an audience of 6,500 people. 

Estadio Víctor Jara features a steel truss supported roof and a rubber based playing surface, which has a polyurethane layer on top. The walls are of reinforced concrete,  in thickness. It also has facilities to lodge up to 185 sportspeople.

Origins 
Estadio Chile was designed in the rationalist style and inaugurated in 1969, being the first roofed sports venue in the country; its construction is the work of the architect Mario Recordón Burnier, with the collaboration of the architect Jorge Patiño.  It has a pulastic court where you can play basketball, indoor soccer and volleyball. International table tennis championships have also been held, and in the past it was used for boxing. In addition, it has a sports residence that can accommodate up to 185 athletes.

In the venue, the Festival of the nueva canción chilena was held between 1969 and 1971, where in 1969, Víctor Jara won first place with the song "Plegaria a un labrador". In 1970 the Santa María de Iquique cantata by Luis Advis was performed by Quilapayún was premiered.

Use as a detention center 
After the Chilean coup of 1973 organized by Chilean Army, who overthrew the socialist government of Salvador Allende. Victor Jara was found at the Universidad Tecnica del Estado and together with Littre Quiroga—which was originally in his office of the National Directorate of Prisons—and other detainees were held at the Estadio Chile, which after the coup was used as a detention center. 

Jara was tortured and killed at the Estadio Chile on 16 September 1973. Before his death, he wrote an untitled poem known as "Estadio Chile" and also as "Somos cinco mil", later it would come into the hands of his wife Joan Jara. In 2003 it was renamed as a memorial to the folk singer-songwriter Jara.

References

External links
 
 Information about the stadium 

Sports venues in Santiago
Indoor arenas in Chile
Music venues in Chile
Internment camps
Torture in Chile
Basketball venues in Chile
Volleyball venues in Chile
1949 establishments in Chile
Sports venues completed in 1949
Things named after Víctor Jara